Helena Bochořáková-Dittrichová (31 July 1894, Vyškov, Moravia – 28 March 1980, Brno, Czechoslovakia) was a Czech illustrator, graphic novelist, and later a painter. She is widely acknowledged as being the first female graphic novelist.

Education and career
Bochořáková-Dittrichová was born in a middle-class family in Vyškov, Moravia, in the Czech Republic. She grew up in the nearby town of Haná and moved with her family to Brno in 1913, where she spent the rest of her life.

In 1919 she began studying painting and drawing at the Academy of Fine Arts in Prague. Upon graduating, in 1923, she received a Ministry of Education scholarship to study modern printmaking in Paris. It was there that she discovered the woodcut novels of pioneering Belgian artist Frans Masereel, who greatly influenced her future work.

Between 1924 and 1930, Bochořáková-Dittrichová had regular exhibitions at the Salon in Paris, as well exhibiting in Antwerp (1925), Philadelphia (1926), Zurich (1927), Buenos Aires (1928), and Vienna (1934). She was a passionate traveller and journeyed extensively throughout Europe, Russia and the United States until the outbreak of the Second World War.

She died in Brno at the age 85. She remains known as one of the leading printmakers and illustrators of the Czech Republic. Her art is showcased in many collections in the Czech Republic, including the Moravian Gallery, Museum Vyskovska, the Academy of Fine Arts in Prague, and the Brno City Museum.

Influences
Bochořáková-Dittrichová was influenced by the Flemish artist, Frans Masereel, while studying in Paris Masereel and other graphic novelists at the time were addressing issues of oppression and social injustice in their works; however, Bochořáková-Dittrichová's work was distinct, presenting the realistic and day-to-day lives of middle-class families, and also domestic issues that resembled her own life and upbringing.

Bochořáková-Dittrichová's art style is resonant with the contemporary trends in a number of European authors – Käthe Kollwitz, Ernst Barlach and Frank Brangwyn.

Major works
Her first work, Z Mého Dětství (From my Childhood), published in 1929, is considered to be the first graphic novel (or wordless novel) published by a woman. The work consists of a story about the day-to-day activities of a sheltered girl in a middle-class family, and is told entirely through woodcuts. The book was later published in an edition of 300 by the British bookshop and gallery A. Zwemmer, formerly of Charing Cross Road London. Her other major work, Malířka Na Cestách (The Painter on the Road), which was unpublished, presents 52 woodcuts and is likely an autobiography of the artists own journey.

List of works

Wordless novels
Z Mého Dětství / From my Childhood (1929)
Z života T.G. Masaryka / From the life of TG Masaryk (1930)
Dřevoryty z USA / Woodcuts from the USA (1933)
Dojmy z SSSR / Impressions of the USSR (1934)
Indiáni jindy a dnes / Indians then and now (1934)
Mezi dvěma oceány : dojmy z cesty po Spojených státech amerických / Between two oceans: Impressions from a trip to the United States (1936)
Švédové před Brnem / Swedes at Brno (1936)
Kristus : 32 dřevorytů k Novému zákonu / Christ: 32 woodcuts from the New Testament (1944)
Nalomená větev / A bruised branch (1947)
Rozkol / The split (1948)
Příboj: román ze 17. století / Surge: a novel of the 17th century (1946)
Oslavanské povstání : dřevoryty : Dva cykly dřevorytů k prosincovým událostem roku 1920 na Rosicko-Oslavansku / Oslavany uprising: Woodcuts: Two cycles of woodcuts to commemorate the December events of 1920 in Rosice-Oslavany (1960)
Uprostřed proudu / Midstream (1967)
Smršť nad Žuráněm / Whirlwind over Žuráň (1969)
Malířka Na Cestách / The Painter on the Road (1930, unpublished)

Woodcuts

Poklad / Treasure (5 woodcuts, 1920)
Válka / War (4 linocuts, 1922)
Kristus / Christ (5 woodcuts, 1922)
Hříchy / Sins (5 woodcuts, 1923)
Kain / Cain (3 woodcuts, 1923)
Zaslíbená zemé / The Promised Land (5 woodcuts, 1923)
Kristus, II. cyklus / Christ, 2nd cycle (5 woodcuts, 1923)
Z Versailles / From Versailles (3 woodcuts, 1933)
Oslavany (5 woodcuts, 1924)
Bloudící / Going Astray (3 linocuts, 1924)
Vyškov (6 woodcuts, 1924)
Marnotratný syn / The Prodigal Son (3 woodcuts, 1924)
Povstání / The Uprising (6 woodcuts, 1925)
Stavba zemského domu / Building a Provincial House (7 woodcuts, 1925)
Zahrada snů / Garden of Dreams (6 drypoints, 1925)
Pohádky / Tales (5 color woodcuts, 1926)
Venezia / Venice (6 color woodcuts, 1926)
Déti / Children (28 line drawings, 1927)
Brno (6 drypoints, 1928)
Brno (4 color linocuts, 1928)
Brno (7 color woodcuts, 1928)
Třinec (5 color woodcuts, 1929)
New York (6 woodcuts, 1932)
Z Nového Mexika / From New Mexico (8 woodcuts, 1933)
U sv. Antonícka / At St. Anthony's (5 woodcuts, 1936)
Na Zakarpatské Rusi / In Zakarpattia Oblast (4 woodcuts, 1938)
Brno po náletech / Brno after the bombings (3 drypoints, 1959)
Přehrada / Reservoir (8 drypoints, 1960)
Stavby socialismu / Construction of Socialism (5 sheets, 1960)
Z veletrhu /  From the Fair (5 woodcuts, 1962)

References

Sources
 David Berona, (2008), Wordless Books: The Original Graphic Novels, Abrams, New York.
 Martin S Cohen, (1977), The Novel in Woodcuts: A Handbook, Journal of Modern Literature volume 6 number 2, pp. 171–195.JSTOR
 Artist's Page on Artsy
 Artist's Page on National Museum of Women in the Arts

Footnotes

External links 
 City of Brno Entry on Helena Bochořáková-Dittrichová
 'Wordless Books' Blog
 Digital copy of Z mého dětství / From my childhood at the Czech Digital Library
 Digital copy of Mezi dvěma oceány / Between two oceans at the Czech Digital Library
 Helena Bochořáková-Dittrichová – The Moravian Library
 Helena Bochořáková – Dittrichová a meziválečná sociální grafika na Moravě

1894 births
1980 deaths
People from Vyškov
Czech graphic designers
Czech illustrators
Czech comics artists
Czech women artists
Czech women painters
Czech female comics artists
Czech women illustrators
Women graphic designers